Municipal elections were held across the Canadian province of Nova Scotia on October 18, 2008.

The following lists races in selected municipalities.

Amherst

Bridgewater

Cape Breton Regional Municipality

Halifax Regional Municipality

Kentville

New Glasgow

Queens Regional Municipality

Truro

Yarmouth

2008 in Nova Scotia
Municipal elections in Nova Scotia
2008 elections in Canada
October 2008 events in Canada